Hiroshige (written: 広重, 啓成 or 弘成) is a masculine Japanese given name. Notable people with the name include:

 (1797–1858), Japanese ukiyo-e artist
 (1829–1869), Japanese ukiyo-e artist
 (1842 or 1843 – 1894), Japanese ukiyo-e artist
Hiroshige Koyama (1937-2016), Japanese botanist
 (born 1962), Japanese botanist
 (born 1972), Japanese footballer

Japanese masculine given names